Wilson Mano (born May 23, 1964) is a former Brazilian football player.

Biography
He started playing career at XV de Jaú. He moved to Corinthians in 1986. Corinthians won the 1990 Campeonato Brasileiro Série A.

On February 26, 1992, he debuted for the Brazil national team against United States.

From 1993, he played for several clubs including Japanese Fujita Industries, Corinthians and Fortaleza. He retired from playing career in 1996.

References

External links

1964 births
Living people
Brazilian footballers
Brazil international footballers
Esporte Clube XV de Novembro (Jaú) players
Sport Club Corinthians Paulista players
Shonan Bellmare players
Grêmio Esportivo Sãocarlense players
Esporte Clube Bahia players
Fortaleza Esporte Clube players